Houtgna (also Huutgna) is a former Tongva settlement in Los Angeles County, California. It was located at Ranchito de Lugo near what is now South Gate, California.

References

Former settlements in Los Angeles County, California
Former populated places in California
Tongva populated places